is a Japanese watercolor painter and a member of the Japan Artists Association.

Works 
Uno trained as a Nihon Buyō dancer, from which she often borrows stories for her paintings. Her paintings depict animals (mostly foxes) which are frequent characters in classical Japanese stories.

External links 
 Internet Musee

Japanese painters
Japanese watercolourists
Modern painters
Living people
1932 births